The 1964 International cricket season was from May 1964 to August 1964.

Season overview

June

Australia in England

July

Netherlands in Denmark

September

West Indies in England

References

1964 in cricket